Oil, Gas and Energy Law (OGEL) is a peer-reviewed academic journal covering all aspects of law pertaining to oil, gas, and energy in general. It publishes short comments, scholarly articles, opinion pieces, and book reviews. The journal was established in 2003 and is published by Maris BV. The founding editor-in-chief was Thomas W. Walde (University of Dundee).  The current editors-in-chief are Kim Talus (Tulane University Law School), Anas F. Alhajji (Energy Economist), and P. Andrews-Speed (National University of Singapore).

OGELFORUM

OGEL hosts the archives of OGELFORUM, the associated discussion list. It is one of the oldest virtual energy discussion fora for discussion, sharing of insights and intelligence of relevant issues related in a significant way to oil, gas and energy issues: Policy, legislation, contracting, security strategy, climate change related to energy. It incorporates the archives of the ENATRES discussion list. Anas F. Alhajji is the current OGELFORUM Moderator.

References

External links
 

Energy economics
Energy policy
Publications established in 2003
Energy law
Environmental law journals
English-language journals
Energy and fuel journals
Oil and gas law